William deVry (born 20 April 1968) is a Canadian film, television theatre, and voice actor. He is best known for his roles in American daytime soap operas, as Tim Dolan on Port Charles, as Michael Cambias on All My Children, as Storm Logan on The Bold and the Beautiful, and as Julian Jerome on General Hospital. He is also known for roles in the Earth: Final Conflict, Stargate SG-1, InSecurity, and Nikita.

Early life
His birth name is William deVry Simard. He moved to Florida with his mother at the age of 19. His grandfather, Herman A. DeVry, founded the DeForest Training School, named after Lee De Forest, Herman's colleague and friend, now known as DeVry University. DeVry comes from a long lineage of athletes and entrepreneurs. His father lettered in several sports in college and his maternal grandmother held 26 world records in track and field.

Career
DeVry appeared in a number of Canadian television series of the 1990s, including recurring roles on Earth: Final Conflict, as Joshua Doors, and on Stargate SG-1, as Aldwin. In 2002, he began his career on American daytime soap operas. His first soap role was on ABC's Port Charles in 2002. He later joined the cast of All My Children, as Michael Cambias, and in 2004 was nominated for a Daytime Emmy Award for Outstanding Supporting Actor in a Drama Series. From 2006 to 2008, he starred on The Bold and the Beautiful as Storm Logan.

DeVry starred in the Canadian comedy series InSecurity in 2011. He had a recurring roles on CW's Nikita and Beauty and the Beast, Netflix's Hemlock Grove, and guest-starred on Castle and NCIS.

In 2013, deVry joined the ABC soap opera General Hospital. Using the alias Derek Wells, deVry is introduced as a media mogul and new boss to Kelly Sullivan's Connie Falconeri. It's later revealed that Derek is in fact mob boss Julian Jerome. DeVry has been involved in a central storyline since his debut and is also well connected to other characters with the reveal that Julian is the father of Sam Morgan (Kelly Monaco) and Lucas Jones (Ryan Carnes), one-time lover of Alexis Davis (Nancy Lee Grahn) and brother of Ava Jerome (Maura West). deVry made his on-screen debut on 30 July. In November 2020, he announced his departure from the role.

Personal life
DeVry is in a relationship with Port Charles actress Rebecca Staab.

Filmography

Film

Television

Awards and nominations

References

External links

1968 births
20th-century Canadian male actors
21st-century Canadian male actors
Anglophone Quebec people
Canadian male film actors
Canadian male television actors
Canadian male voice actors
Canadian male soap opera actors
Living people
Male actors from Montreal